Saunders Island is a crescent-shaped island  long, lying between Candlemas Island and Montagu Island in the South Sandwich Islands, a British Overseas Territory in the southern Atlantic Ocean. It is a volcanic island composed of an active stratovolcano,  Mount Michael.

History
Saunders Island was discovered in 1775 by Captain James Cook, who named it for Sir Charles Saunders, First Lord of the Admiralty. It was charted in greater detail by Bellingshausen in 1819, and in 1930 by Discovery Investigations (DI) personnel aboard Discovery II. Polar explorer Ernest Shackleton sometimes misspells the island's name as "Sanders Island" in his book South.

Features

The centre of the island is Mount Michael, a volcano known to have erupted explosively in 1819, and has erupted repeatedly since 2000, most recently in 2005. The  diameter summit crater contains a persistent lava lake, one of only eight in the world.

On the east coast of the island is Sombre Point, the island's northeast point. The name applied by United Kingdom Antarctic Place-Names Committee (UK-APC) in 1971 refers to the dark and dull aspect of the basaltic rock and ash in this vicinity. Cordelia Bay is a small bight which along the entire east side of the island. It was charted in 1930 by DI personnel and named for Cordelia Carey, daughter of Discovery II captain Commander W.M. Carey.

West of Sombre Point are the Yellowstone Crags, a group of crags which are eroded into striking pinnacles. The name applied by UK-APC in 1971 refers to the yellow colour of the tuff rocks and their craggy topography. Ollivant Point and Carey Point have both been referred to as the island's westernmost point. Both were named by UK-APC, for Martin Ollivant, Captain of HMS Protector at the time of her survey of the island, and Commander Carey, respectively.

See also 
 List of Antarctic and sub-Antarctic islands

References

 
 
Volcano World: Mount Michael

Islands of the South Sandwich Islands
Uninhabited islands of South Georgia and the South Sandwich Islands